Josh Woods (born January 17, 1998) is a professional gridiron football linebacker for the BC Lions of the Canadian Football League (CFL).

College career
Woods played college football for the UCLA Bruins from 2015 to 2019. He played in 31 games where he had 69 solo tackles, 42 assisted tackles, 5.5 sacks, two fumble recoveries, two pass knockdowns, and one interception.

Professional career
Woods signed with the BC Lions on October 8, 2021. He made his professional debut in the penultimate game of the 2021 season on November 12, 2021, against the Calgary Stampeders. He played in two regular season games that year where he had one defensive tackle.

After beginning the 2022 season on the injured list, Woods played in 17 regular season games where he had 23 defensive tackles, 12 special teams tackles, and two sacks. He also played in both post-season games where he had six defensive tackles and two special teams tackles.

Personal life
Woods was born to parents Dominic and Jennifer Woods.

References

External links
 BC Lions bio

1998 births
Living people
American football linebackers
BC Lions players
Canadian football linebackers
People from Ontario, California
Players of American football from California
Players of Canadian football from California
UCLA Bruins football players